Columbia Sussex is a privately owned hotel company based in Crestview Hills, Kentucky. The company, owned by the Yung family, owns and operates hotels in various parts of the United States. The current president and founder is William J. Yung III.

Current portfolio
, the company operates 40 hotels under 3 different major brands and many sub-brands consisting of 30 full-service Marriotts including 1 JW Marriott and 3 Renaissance Hotels and 1 limited service Courtyard by Marriott, 2 Hyatt Regency Hotels, 2 Westin Hotels, and 5 Hiltons including the Boulders Resort which is formerly a Waldorf Astoria property now operating under Hilton's Curio brand and 1 DoubleTree Hotel. The Westin Dawn Beach in Sint Maarten is currently not in operation due to damage from Hurricane Irma; however, the adjacent timeshare buildings have been repaired and re-opened in December 2018.

Peak
At its peak in 2007, Columbia Sussex owned 86 hotels with 32,604 rooms and 13 casinos. The majority of the portfolio was lost during the great recession between 2008 and 2012.

Included in the rooms lost by Columbia Sussex are 5,821 rooms (or 14 hotels) that were acquired by Blackstone after it bought out $300 million in debt on the 14 properties at a steep discount. Although Columbia Sussex made every payment required by the terms of the loan, Blackstone seized the portfolio via a "deed in lieu of foreclosure" in December 2010 after the loan securing the portfolio had hit maturity and Columbia Sussex was unable to re-finance due to the credit crisis. Blackstone had previously sold the same hotels to Columbia Sussex for $1.4 billion in 2006.

Motels
Columbia Sussex began operation as Columbia Development in 1972 with the construction of a single Days Inn location in Richwood, KY. Rapid expansion followed and by 1978 the company was renamed Columbia Sussex and was the largest Days Inn franchisee with 14 locations many with restaurants named after the founder's wife, Marty.

Hotels
In 1977 Columbia Sussex purchased their first full-service hotel, The President Motor Inn in Fort Wright, KY. The hotel was closed for renovations and re-opened as a Ramada Inn.

Columbia Sussex then began a campaign of acquiring Holiday Inns and renovating them into properties featuring the Holidome concept. Together with the new loyalty program, Priority Club, which was a trailblazing concept at the time, market success followed. Holiday Inns were acquired in Dayton, OH, Springfield, OH, and a group of 4 Holiday Inns in Charleston, WV.

In 1980 Columbia Sussex completed their largest acquisition to date with the purchase of the 400 room Holiday Inn in Southfield, MI.

In the early 1980s Columbia Sussex continued to grow mainly through acquisition while focusing primarily on the Holiday Inn brand.

In 1983 a 400-room Holiday Inn was purchased and renovated in Louisville, Kentucky.

In 1984 Columbia Sussex began expanding through construction of new hotels. Major projects included a Holiday Inn Rochester, NY which served as the company's flagship for a few years. Also constructed in 1984 was a 400-room motel in Kissimmee, FL which carried the Best Western Flag. This was the last exterior corridor property ever constructed by the company. Columbia Sussex also opened the newly constructed Hilton Louisville East and purchased the Plymouth, MI Hilton.

In 1985 Columbia Sussex purchased 3 Holiday Inns in the Chicago Area in Glen Ellyn, Itasca and Hillside. 1985 marked the end of the Holiday Inn focus for the company and the beginning of the Radisson Era.

Columbia Sussex became the first franchisee of Radisson hotels with the purchase, renovation and re-branding of the Americana Hotel at the Cincinnati Airport located in Northern, KY. At the time of its opening the Radisson CVG was the 14th hotel with the Radisson brand in the US.

Development of many new construction hotels followed in the late 1980s and early 90s of mostly Radisson branded hotels.

In 1994 Radisson hotels in 5 cities were converted to Marriott. These were the first of many as Columbia Sussex transitioned from the largest Radisson franchisee to the largest full service Marriott Franchisee.

In 2005 Columbia Sussex substantially upgraded their portfolio by acquiring 14 properties from Wyndham International for $1.4 billion. Columbia Sussex repositioned these properties into 3 Hiltons, 2 Marriotts, 2 Sheratons, and 6 Westins after significant remodeling.

In 2006 Columbia Sussex purchased 2 Hiltons in Arlington, VA and Sacramento, CA from 
Blackstone in a $150m deal.

2007 marked Columbia Sussex's acquisition of the Sanibel Harbour Resort and Spa from Liberty Mutual Insurance for $126m. The property was re-branded as a Marriott in 2009.

In 2013 Columbia Sussex bought an historic building in downtown Cincinnati called the Bartlett Building. A former bank, the building was extensively renovated and converted into a hotel branded the Renaissance Cincinnati Downtown. The hotel opened in summer of 2014.

Casinos
Columbia Sussex entered the gaming industry in 1990, purchasing the High Sierra hotel in Stateline, Nevada from Del Webb Corporation for $19 million. The property was renamed as the Horizon Casino Resort.

The Lighthouse Point Casino in Greenville, Mississippi was opened in November 1996. Columbia owned the riverboat casino and a 79% stake in its operating company.

In March 2002, JMBS Casino, a Columbia Sussex affiliate controlled by William Yung's children, bought Bayou Caddy's Jubilee Casino, a riverboat in Greenville, for $42 million.

In 2002, Columbia bought the closed Maxim Hotel and Casino near the Las Vegas Strip for $38 million. After a $90 million renovation, the property was reopened in 2003 as the Westin Casuarina, using the name of Columbia's resort in the Cayman Islands.

In 2004, Columbia bought the River Palms in Laughlin, Nevada and the Harrah's Vicksburg casino in Vicksburg, Mississippi, which it renamed to the Horizon Vicksburg.

In October 2004, Columbia agreed to buy the President Casino St. Louis from bankrupt President Casinos for $57 million. The company planned a $150 million residential and retail development around the casino, even though some of the land was already earmarked for Pinnacle Entertainment's Lumière Place project. The sale collapsed a year later, however, when Columbia withdrew its application for a gaming license. According to a lawsuit filed by President, the Missouri Gaming Commission was set to reject the application for "flimsy" reasons, including an IRS audit of Yung's 2000 income tax return and his use of a corporate credit card for personal expenses. President eventually won a judgment of $28 million plus $14 million in interest, for breach of contract and for unreasonable fee increases at the casino parking lot, which Columbia had already purchased.

In 2005, Columbia bought the Bally's New Orleans casino from Caesars Entertainment for $24 million. Caesars needed to sell the casino to avoid antitrust concerns in its acquisition by Harrah's Entertainment, owner and operator of Harrah's New Orleans. It was later renamed as the Amelia Belle.

The same year, Columbia bought Caesars Tahoe in Stateline from Caesars Entertainment for $45 million, and renamed it as the MontBleu.

Columbia bought the Argosy Casino riverboat in Baton Rouge, Louisiana from Penn National Gaming in October 2005 for $150 million and renamed it as the Belle of Baton Rouge. The sale assuaged FTC antitrust concerns about Penn's acquisition of Argosy Gaming, which would have resulted in the company owning the only two casinos in the city.

The company made a second attempt to enter the St. Louis market in May 2006, agreeing to pay $200 million for the Casino Queen riverboat in East St. Louis, Illinois, across the river from the President Casino. However, after ordering Casino Queen the following January to remove a minority shareholder with ties to an organized crime associate, the Illinois Gaming Board did not approve the sale by the February deadline set in the contract, and Columbia ended the deal in March.

In December 2006, Columbia opened a 317-room $150 million Westin resort with a casino on the Caribbean island of Sint Maarten.

Aztar acquisition and Tropicana related bankruptcy
In January 2007, Columbia acquired Aztar for $2.1 billion, after winning a bidding war against Ameristar Casinos and Pinnacle Entertainment. Aztar owned five casinos:  the Tropicana Las Vegas, Tropicana Casino & Resort Atlantic City, Ramada Express in Laughlin, Casino Aztar in Evansville, Indiana and Casino Aztar in Caruthersville, Missouri. A new subsidiary, Tropicana Entertainment LLC, was created to hold Columbia's and Aztar's casinos.

Columbia Sussex did not want to make another try for a Missouri gaming license, so Aztar agreed before the acquisition to sell the Caruthersville casino to Fortunes Entertainment, the company of Argosy Gaming co-founder Lance Callis. The deal fell through because the licensing process for Fortunes could not be completed on schedule, so to avoid closing the casino, Aztar allowed the Gaming Commission to appoint a supervisor to operate it, effective when the merger closed. Casino Aztar was finally sold in June 2007 for $45 million to Isle of Capri, which renamed it as Lady Luck Casino.

At the time of the Aztar acquisition, the Tropicana Atlantic City was placed in a trust pending Yung's licensing by the New Jersey Casino Control Commission. Yung's license was denied in December 2007 due in part to complaints about the Tropicana's maintenance and sanitation after Yung laid off 1,300 staffers. The commission declared that the company displayed a "lack of business ability, a lack of financial responsibility, and a lack of good character, honesty and integrity," and a "defiance of the regulatory process." Former New Jersey Supreme Court Justice Gary Stein was appointed as trustee and conservator of the property, with a mandate to find a new buyer.

The loss of the Atlantic City property led Tropicana to default on its bank debt. Yung tried to sell the Vicksburg and Evansville casinos to raise cash to appease creditors, but it was not enough to prevent a lawsuit by bondholders. The Delaware Court of Chancery ruled in February 2008 that the transfer of the property to Stein constituted a technical default on the bonds. Stein asked to transfer the title back to Tropicana to cure the default, but the Commission roundly rejected the request. With no other options remaining, Tropicana Entertainment filed for Chapter 11 bankruptcy in May.

Debtholders viewed Yung's presence as a "distraction" and asked a court to appoint a trustee to run the company. Yung settled the dispute by agreeing in July to step down, leaving the other four board members in place.

In May 2009, Tropicana, seeking to focus its Tahoe-area efforts on the MontBleu, transferred the Horizon Casino to a Columbia Sussex affiliate. Table games at the casino were eliminated, with a possible downsizing of slots also planned.

The Tropicana Las Vegas, which had a $440 million secured loan against it, emerged from bankruptcy in July 2009 as a separate company led by Canadian private equity firm Onex and former MGM Mirage president Alex Yemenidjian. The remainder of the company emerged on March 8, 2010 as Tropicana Entertainment, led by Carl Icahn.

The Amelia Belle, which was not included in the bankruptcy, was sold in October 2009 to Peninsula Gaming, owner of the Evangeline Downs racetrack, for $107 million.

The Westin Casuarina Las Vegas, which also was not included in the bankruptcy, defaulted on its mortgage in April 2010, and lenders, led by CW Financial Services, filed for foreclosure the following November. The hotel's general manager said in October 2011 that Columbia Sussex would not fight the foreclosure.

Hotel brands operated

Marriott International
 Marriott
 JW Marriott Hotels
 Renaissance Hotels
 Courtyard by Marriott
 Westin Hotels

Hilton Hotels
 Hilton
 DoubleTree by Hilton
 Curio by Hilton

Hyatt Hotels
 Hyatt Regency

References

External links
 

Companies based in Kentucky
Gambling companies of the United States
Hospitality companies of the United States